The Equal Access to COBRA Act was a bill which would amend the Internal Revenue Code, the Employee Retirement Income Security Act of 1974, and the Public Health Service Act to extend COBRA health insurance coverage to qualified beneficiaries, defined to include domestic partners. The bill was introduced on March 25, 2010, by Senator Barbara Boxer. It was also later introduced by Representative Anthony Weiner on March 10, 2011.

Background
COBRA requires that a person and his or her spouse and dependent children be allowed to continue employer-sponsored health coverage after the employee leaves or loses his or her job. However, there is no requirement that benefits be extended to the employee's same-sex partner or spouse. To qualify for COBRA it may depend on the size of an individual's employer, and the individual cannot have their current health insurance.

Status
Upon being introduced, the bill was read twice and sent to the Senate Committee on Health, Education, Labor, and Pensions. The bill never left committee.

References

External links 
 

2010 in LGBT history
LGBT rights in the United States
United States proposed federal health legislation
United States proposed federal taxation legislation
Proposed legislation of the 111th United States Congress
Proposed legislation of the 112th United States Congress
Anthony Weiner